V. Kavi Chelvan (born 2 July 1989) is a Malaysian footballer who plays for PDRM FA as a midfielder.  He is also a police officer, ranked Inspector, for the Royal Malaysian Police.

Education
V. Kavi Chelvan graduated from Universiti Putra Malaysia with a degree in human resource on 2012. He graduated together with another notable Malaysian footballer Mahali Jasuli.

References

External links
 

1989 births
Living people
Malaysian footballers
People from Selangor
Melaka United F.C. players
Negeri Sembilan FA players
Malaysian police officers
Malaysian people of Indian descent
Association football midfielders